The 2009–10 season of the Belgian Pro League (also known as Jupiler Pro League for sponsorship reasons) was the 107th season of top-tier football in Belgium. The season began on 31 July 2009 with the first matches of the regular season, and ended in May 2010 with the last matches of the playoff round. Standard Liège were the defending champions.

The competition underwent a significant overhaul for this season by reducing the number of teams and, for the first time in the history of the league, introducing a playoff system to determine the Belgian champions.

On April 18, 2010, Anderlecht became champions as a result of a 1–2 victory in Bruges against one of their main rivals, Club Brugge.

Changes from 2008–09

Structural changes
The league size has been reduced from eighteen to sixteen teams. Further, the competition has been split into two stages, a conventional season and playoffs.

The participating clubs will first play a conventional round-robin schedule for a total of 30 matches. After the conclusion of those matches, the team ranked 16th will be directly relegated to the Belgian Second Division, while every other team will play in a playoff round according to its league table position.

The first six teams will play in the Championship playoff. Points earned during the regular season are halved with an odd number of points being rounded up. The round will be played on a round-robin schedule. The winner of this round has won the Belgian championship and will participate in the third qualifying round of the 2010–11 UEFA Champions League. The runners-up will also play in the third qualifying round of the Champions League, while the third-placed team will enter the third qualifying round of the 2010–11 UEFA Europa League. Finally, the fourth-placed team will have to compete in a single match (called Testmatch) against the winner of the Europa League playoff (see below) for one spot in the second qualifying round of the UEFA Europa League.

The teams finishing seventh through fourteenth will play in the Europa League playoff and start with zero points. The round will be played in two groups, with teams in positions 7, 9, 12 and 14 comprising Group A, and the remaining teams comprising Group B. Each group will be played on a round-robin schedule. The winners of these groups will then compete in a two-legged series to earn the right to play against the fourth-placed team of the Championship playoff for one spot in the second qualifying round of the UEFA Europa League.

The 15th-placed team will participate in the Relegation playoff, along with the teams ranked second through fifth in the Belgian Second Division. The winners of the playoff will earn a place in the 2010–11 Belgian First Division.

Team changes
 Mons and Tubize were relegated.
 Sint-Truiden was promoted.
 Roeselare beat Dender, Lierse and Antwerp in the playoffs and was thus allowed to remain in the league. Dender was relegated while Lierse and Antwerp remained in the second division.

Team information

Stadia and locations

Personnel and sponsoring

Managerial changes

During summer break

During the season

Regular season

Financial troubles of Mouscron
During the season, Mouscron got into financial trouble. This caused months of debate and several law procedures, with the fate of Mouscron changing from week to week. The board of Mouscron finally accepted the bankruptcy of Mouscron on 28 December 2009. At that point, the last two matches of Mouscron had already been forfeited as many players refused to play due to wages from November and December not being paid; three forfeits in a row would have also caused immediate elimination and relegation to the Belgian Third Division.

As a result of the bankruptcy and relegation, Mouscron's record was expunged.

League table

Positions by round
Note: The classification was made after the weekend (or midweek) of each matchday, so postponed matches were only processed at the time they were played to represent the real evolution in standings. The postponed matches are:
 Matchday 19: Mechelen vs. Germinal Beerschot of 18 December, Charleroi vs. Standard and Anderlecht vs. Club Brugge  of 20 December. The matches will be played in the beginning of February, between the 24th and 25th matchday.
 Matchday 22: Club Brugge vs. Westerlo of 16 January which was played during the 24th matchday on 30 January.
 Matchday 23: Cercle Brugge vs. Charleroi of 23 January (as a result of the first leg of the quarter final of the Belgian Cup between Anderlecht and Cercle Brugge being played on this date). The new date for this match is 24 February, between matchdays 27 and 28.
 Matchday 24: Sint-Truiden vs. Westerlo of 30 January (as a result of the postponement of the match Club Brugge vs. Westerlo to this date) is postponed to 3 February, which is between matchdays 24 and 25. Because of snowfall, both Roeselare vs. Genk and Charleroi vs. Lokeren were postponed. The match Charleroi vs. Lokeren was originally scheduled to be played on February 10 between matchdays 25 and 26, but was postponed again because of more snow  and will now be played on March 10 between matchdays 28 and 29. Roeselare vs. Genk was rescheduled to 24 February, between matchdays 27 and 28.
 Matchday 26: Yet again snow caused several matches to be postponed, in this case Mechelen-Genk, Cercle Brugge-Lokeren, Charleroi-Anderlecht and Germinal Beerschot-Zulte-Waregem. All matches were rescheduled to be played during the weekend of the 29th matchday, on March 6 and 7.
 Matchday 29: Due to the rescheduling of several matches to the first weekend of March, when this matchday was to be played, the whole matchday was postponed one week. With both Anderlecht and Standard Liège still playing in the UEFA Europa League on Thursdays, all matches will be played on Sunday 14 March at 20:00.
 Matchday 30: With matchday 29 moved to 14 March, matchday 30 was also rescheduled, to Sunday 21 March.

On top of that, the results of Mouscron were annulled between matchdays 20 and 21, causing many shifts between those matchdays. Also, for the rest of the season, there will be no point at which all teams have played the same number of matches, until at the end.

Results
Note: All Mouscron results listed below were expunged after the club had to declare bankruptcy during the season. They are listed here for information purposes. Matches which were to be competed after Mouscron's exemption have been shaded.

Championship playoff
The points obtained during the regular season were halved (and rounded up) before the start of the playoff. Thus, Anderlecht started with 35 points, Club Brugge with 29, Gent with 25, Kortrijk 23 and both Sint-Truiden and Zulte-Waregem started with 21.

Playoff table

Positions by round

Results

Europa League playoff

Group A

Group B

Europa League playoff final
The winners of both playoff groups will compete in a two-legged match. The winners on aggregate will compete in another match (called Testmatch) against a team from the championship playoff (see below). If both teams are tied after two matches, the away goals rule will be applied. Should both teams still be tied afterwards, thirty minutes of extra time will be played and, if necessary, a penalty shootout will be conducted.

Genk won 5–2 on aggregate.

Testmatches Europa League
The fourth-placed team from the championship playoff and the winners of the Europa League playoff competed for one spot in the third qualifying round of the 2010–11 UEFA Europa League.

Note: The spot in the second qualifying round of the 2010–11 UEFA Europa League was taken by Cercle Brugge, who was the runners-up of the 2009–10 Belgian Cup to Champions League-qualified Gent.

Genk won 5–3 on aggregate.

Goalscorers
The list of goalscorers is split up: first there is the list of goalscorers during the regular competition, deciding the official title of league 'topscorer', which was won by Romelu Lukaku. After this, the goalscorers in the play-offs are listed below in a second list. Because not all teams get equal matches in the playoffs, the goals during the playoffs did not count to determine the top scorer and therefore there are two separate lists.

Regular competition

Top goalscorers

Other scorers
8 goals (6 players)

 Mahamadou Dissa (Roeselare)
 Julien Gorius (Mechelen)
 Oleg Iachtchouk (Cercle Brugge)
 Ibou (Kortrijk)
 Jaycee (Mouscron)
 Aloys Nong (Mechelen)

7 goals (5 players)

 David de Storme (Mechelen)
 Tom De Sutter (Anderlecht)
 Aleksandr Jakovenko (Westerlo)
 Chris Makiese (Zulte Waregem)
 Marvin Ogunjimi (Genk)

6 goals (11 players)

 Joseph Akpala (Club Brugge)
 Thomas Buffel (Cercle Brugge (2) and Genk (4))
 Cephas Chimedza (Sint-Truiden)
 Dieter Dekelver (Westerlo)
 Miloš Marić (Gent)
 Ivan Perišić (Club Brugge)
 Kevin Roelandts (Zulte Waregem)
 Wesley Sonck (Club Brugge)
 Matías Suárez (Anderlecht)
 Bjarni Viðarsson (Roeselare)
 Jelle Vossen (Genk (0) and Cercle Brugge (6))

5 goals (11 players)

 Randall Azofeifa (Gent)
 Leon Benko (Kortrijk)
 Mehdi Carcela-Gonzalez (Standard Liège)
 Adnan Čustović (Gent)
 Tosin Dosunmu (Germinal Beerschot)
 Karel Geraerts (Club Brugge)
 Habib Habibou (Charleroi)
 Roland Juhász (Anderlecht)
 Mbaye Leye (Gent)
 Dániel Tőzsér (Genk)
 Axel Witsel (Standard Liège)

4 goals (17 players)

 Franck Berrier (Zulte Waregem)
 Mario Carević (Lokeren)
 Davy De Beule (Kortrijk)
 Igor De Camargo (Standard Liège)
 Joeri Dequevy (Roeselare)
 Samir El Gaaouiri (Roeselare)
 Jonathan Legear (Anderlecht)
 Sherjill MacDonald (Germinal Beerschot)
 Dieumerci Mbokani (Standard Liège)
 Vadis Odjidja-Ofoe (Club Brugge)
 Reynaldo (Anderlecht (0) and Cercle Brugge (4))
 Nikita Rukavytsya (Roeselare)
 Sulejman Smajić (Lokeren)
 Bertin Tomou (Westerlo (3) and Roeselare (1))
 Ronald Vargas (Club Brugge)
 Jonathan Wilmet (Sint-Truiden)
 Stef Wils (Gent)

3 goals (19 players)

 Elyaniv Barda (Genk)
 Frederik Boi (Cercle Brugge)
 Fabien Camus (Genk)
 Steven de Petter (Westerlo)
 Stijn De Smet (Gent)
 Karel D'Haene (Zulte Waregem)
 Peter Delorge (Sint-Truiden)
 Vincent Euvrard (Sint-Truiden)
 Bernt Evens (Westerlo)
 Nicolás Frutos (Anderlecht)
 Torben Joneleit (Genk)
 Christophe Lepoint (Gent)
 Maxime Lestienne (Mouscron (3) and Club Brugge (0))
 Zlatan Ljubijankič (Gent)
 Sanharib Malki (Germinal Beerschot (2) and Lokeren (1))
 Ondřej Mazuch (Anderlecht)
 Adnan Mravac (Westerlo)
 Roberto Rosales (Gent)
 Tomo Šokota (Lokeren)

2 goals (38 players)

 Jonathan Aspas (Mouscron)
 Karim Belhocine (Kortrijk)
 Maxime Biset (Mechelen)
 Bojan Božović (Cercle Brugge)
 João Carlos (Genk)
 Daniel Chávez (Club Brugge)
 Grégory Christ (Charleroi)
 Laurent Ciman (Kortrijk)
 Philippe Clement (Germinal Beerschot)
 Cyriac (Standard Liège)
 Mohamed Dahmane (Club Brugge)
 Wilfried Dalmat (Standard Liège)
 Nabil Dirar (Club Brugge)
 Olivier Doll (Lokeren)
 Ederson (Genk (0) and Charleroi (2))
 Steffen Ernemann (Zulte Waregem)
 Guillaume François (Mouscron (2) and Germinal Beerschot (0))
 Guillaume Gillet (Anderlecht)
 Ibrahima Gueye (Lokeren)
 Moussa Koita (Genk)
 Robert Maah (Mouscron)
 Marcel Mbayo (Lokeren)
 Mohamed Messoudi (Kortrijk)
 Carlos Moreno (Mouscron)
 Geoffrey Mujangi Bia (Charleroi)
 Joachim Mununga (Mechelen)
 Stefan Nikolić (Roeselare)
 Vuza Nyoni (Cercle Brugge)
 Hervé Onana (Sint-Truiden)
 Abdelmajid Oulmers (Charleroi)
 Anthony Portier (Cercle Brugge)
 Mats Rits (Germinal Beerschot)
 Serhiy Serebrennikov (Cercle Brugge)
 Bernd Thijs (Gent)
 Jelle Van Damme (Anderlecht)
 Romeo Van Dessel (Mechelen)
 Ludwin Van Nieuwenhuyze (Zulte Waregem)
 David Vandenbroeck (Charleroi (0) and Kortrijk (2))

1 goal (60 players)

 Antolin Alcaraz (Club Brugge)
 Alex (Sint-Truiden)
 Arnor Angeli (Standard Liège)
 Lucas Biglia (Anderlecht)
 Maxime Brillault (Charleroi)
 Yoni Buyens (Mechelen)
 Brecht Capon (Kortrijk)
 Issame Charaï (Sint-Truiden)
 Cédric Ciza (Anderlecht (0) and Charleroi (1))
 Alessandro Cordaro (Charleroi)
 Hans Cornelis (Cercle Brugge)
 Daniel Cruz (Germinal Beerschot)
 Koen Daerden (Club Brugge (0) and Standard Liège (1))
 Kevin De Bruyne (Genk)
 Steven Defour (Standard Liège)
 Jef Delen (Westerlo)
 Boubacar Dialiba (Mechelen)
 Ryan Donk (Club Brugge)
 Chemcedine El Araichi (Mouscron)
 Hassan El Mouataz (Lokeren)
 Rachid Farssi (Westerlo)
 Felipe (Standard Liège)
 Jimmy Hempte (Kortrijk)
 Abdul-Yakuni Iddi (Mechelen)
 Jonas Ivens (Mechelen)
 Kanu (Anderlecht)
 Dejan Kelhar (Cercle Brugge)
 Mahamoudou Kéré (Charleroi)
 Cheikhou Kouyaté (Anderlecht)
 Sven Kums (Kortrijk)
 Ivan Leko (Germinal Beerschot (0) and Lokeren (1))
 Ellenton Liliu (Westerlo)
 Emil Lyng (Zulte Waregem)
 Eliaquim Mangala (Standard Liège)
 Stijn Meert (Zulte Waregem)
 Tomislav Mikulić (Standard Liège (0) and Germinal Beerschot (1))
 Damir Mirvić (Roeselare)
 Jarno Molenberghs (Westerlo)
 Ernest Nfor (Zulte Waregem)
 Denis Odoi (Sint-Truiden)
 Orlando (Charleroi (0) and Genk (1))
 Nebojša Pavlović (Kortrijk)
 Luigi Pieroni (Gent)
 Sébastien Pocognoli (Standard Liège)
 Giuseppe Rossini (Mechelen)
 Berat Sadik (Zulte Waregem)
 Nils Schouterden (Sint-Truiden)
 Tony Sergeant (Cercle Brugge)
 Tim Smolders (Gent)
 Tom Soetaers (Kortrijk (0) and Mechelen (1))
 Jérémy Taravel (Zulte Waregem)
 Bavon Tshibuabua (Germinal Beerschot)
 Glenn Van Asten (Westerlo)
 Günther Vanaudenaerde (Westerlo)
 Daan van Gijseghem (Mouscron (1) and Club Brugge (0))
 Joris Van Hout (Westerlo)
 Marc Wagemakers (Sint-Truiden)
 Marcin Wasilewski (Anderlecht)
 Samuel Yeboah (Genk)
 Yoav Ziv (Lokeren)

Own goals (12 players, 12 goals)

 Frederik Boi (Cercle Brugge, goal scored for Anderlecht)
 Steve Colpaert (Zulte Waregem, goal scored for Mechelen)
 Dominic Foley (Cercle Brugge, goal scored for Genk)
 Eliaquim Mangala (Standard Liège, goal scored for Anderlecht)
 Eric Matoukou (Genk, goal scored for Mouscron)
 Anthony Portier (Cercle Brugge, goal scored for Kortrijk)
 Roberto Rosales (Gent, goal scored for Kortrijk)
 Jurgen Sierens (Roeselare, goal scored for Anderlecht)
 Tiago Silva (Genk, goal scored for Zulte Waregem)
 Moussa Traoré (Standard Liège, goal scored for Anderlecht)
 Jelle Van Damme (Anderlecht, goal scored for Club Brugge)
 Bram Vandenbussche (Roeselare, goal scored for Kortrijk)

Playoff goalscorers

Championship playoff
30 games, 83 goals ( per game)
5 goals (4 players)

 Christian Benteke (Kortrijk)
 Mbark Boussoufa (Anderlecht)
 Matías Suárez (Anderlecht)
 Jelle Van Damme (Anderlecht)

4 goals (1 player)
 Adnan Čustović (Gent)

3 goals (6 players)

 Davy De Beule (Kortrijk)
 Guillaume Gillet (Anderlecht)
 Dorge Kouemaha (Club Brugge)
 Christophe Lepoint (Gent)
 Ernest Nfor (Zulte Waregem)
 Ivan Perišić (Club Brugge)

2 goals (9 players)

 Randall Azofeifa (Gent)
 Elimane Coulibaly (Gent)
 Peter Delorge (Sint-Truiden)
 Nabil Dirar (Club Brugge)
 Yassine El Ghanassy (Gent)
 Christophe Grondin (Gent)
 Mbaye Leye (Gent)
 Kevin Roelandts (Zulte Waregem)
 Sébastien Siani (Sint-Truiden)

1 goal (20 players)

 Joseph Akpala (Club Brugge)
 Ziguy Badibanga (Anderlecht)
 Ludovic Buysens (Sint-Truiden)
 Bart Buysse (Zulte Waregem)
 Mario Cantaluppi (Zulte Waregem)
 Thomas Chatelle (Anderlecht)
 Tom De Sutter (Anderlecht)
 Peter Delorge (Sint-Truiden)
 Ryan Donk (Club Brugge)
 Roland Juhász (Anderlecht)
 Maxime Lestienne (Club Brugge)
 Zlatan Ljubijankič (Gent)
 Ondřej Mazuch (Anderlecht)
 Luigi Pieroni (Gent)
 Nils Schouterden (Sint-Truiden)
 Jeroen Simaeys (Club Brugge)
 Wesley Sonck (Club Brugge)
 Jérémy Taravel (Zulte Waregem)
 Bernd Thijs (Gent)
 David Vandenbroeck (Kortrijk)

Own goals (2 players, 3 goals)
 Miguel Dachelet (2) (Zulte Waregem, goals scored for Sint-Truiden and Club Brugge)
 Ryan Donk (Club Brugge, goal scored for Anderlecht)

Europa League Playoff
24 games, 73 goals ( per game)
5 goals (1 player)
 Dominic Foley (Cercle Brugge)

4 goals (1 player)
 Elyaniv Barda (Genk)

3 goals (3 players)

 Julien Gorius (Mechelen)
 Ellenton Liliu (Westerlo)
 Dieumerci Mbokani (Standard Liège)

2 goals (12 players)

 Lens Annab (Westerlo)
 Igor De Camargo (Standard Liège)
 Daniel Cruz (Germinal Beerschot)
 Omer Golan (Lokeren)
 Faris Haroun (Germinal Beerschot)
 Aleksandr Jakovenko (Westerlo)
 Joachim Mununga (Mechelen)
 Marvin Ogunjimi (Genk)
 Killian Overmeire (Lokeren)
 Tom Soetaers (Mechelen)
 Tomo Šokota (Lokeren)
 Samuel Yeboah (Genk)

1 goal (31 players)

 Maxime Biset (Mechelen)
 Frederik Boi (Cercle Brugge)
 Thomas Buffel (Genk)
 Fabien Camus (Genk)
 Grégory Christ (Charleroi)
 Alessandro Cordaro (Charleroi)
 Hans Cornelis (Cercle Brugge)
 Kevin De Bruyne (Genk)
 Steven de Petter (Westerlo)
 Antun Dunković (Mechelen)
 Ibrahima Gueye (Lokeren)
 Oleg Iachtchouk (Cercle Brugge)
 Dawid Janczyk (Germinal Beerschot)
 Ivan Leko (Lokeren)
 Sanharib Malki (Lokeren)
 Eric Matoukou (Genk)
 Benjamin Mokulu (Lokeren)
 Andréa Mbuyi-Mutombo (Standard Liège)
 Aloys Nong (Mechelen)
 Jérémy Perbet (Lokeren)
 Jaime Alfonso Ruiz (Westerlo)
 Tony Sergeant (Cercle Brugge)
 Jérémy Serwy (Charleroi)
 Cyril Théréau (Charleroi)
 Moussa Traoré (Standard Liège)
 Katuku Tshimanga (Lokeren)
 Joris Van Hout (Westerlo)
 Nico Van Kerckhoven (Westerlo)
 Günther Vanaudenaerde (Westerlo)
 Justice Wamfor (Germinal Beerschot)
 Axel Witsel (Standard Liège)

Source: sporza.be and Sport.be

Season statistics
Regular competition records beaten or equalized during playoff games are listed as such.

Scoring
First goal of the season: Cephas Chimedza for Sint-Truiden against Standard Liège, 24 minutes (31 July 2009).
First own goal of the season: Frederik Boi (Cercle Brugge) for Anderlecht, (8 August 2009).
First hat-trick of the season: Milan Jovanović for Standard Liège against Roeselare (15 August 2009).
First penalty kick of the season: Axel Witsel (missed) for Standard Liège against Sint-Truiden, 90 minutes (31 July 2009).
Fastest goal in a match: 58 seconds – Sherjill MacDonald for Germinal Beerschot against Roeselare (28 November 2009).
Goal scored at the latest point in a match: 90+7 minutes – Arnor Angeli for Standard Liège against Kortrijk (26 September 2009).
Winning goal scored at the latest point in a match: 90+4 minutes - Cyril Théréau for Charleroi against Germinal Beerschot (16 August 2009)
Widest winning margin: 5 Goals

Mouscron 0–5 Lokeren (12 December 2009).
Germinal Beerschot 0–5 Anderlecht (29 January 2010).

Playoffs: 6 goals - Anderlecht 6-0 Zulte Waregem (28 March 2010)
Playoffs: AA Gent 5-0 Zulte Waregem (18 April 2010)

Most goals in a match by one team: 5 Goals

Roeselare 1-5 Standard Liège (15 August 2009)
AA Gent 5-1 Roeselare (12 September 2009)
KV Mechelen 2-5 AA Gent (4 December 2009)
Mouscron 0–5 Lokeren (12 December 2009)
Sint-Truiden 5-2 KV Mechelen (26 December 2009)
Germinal Beerschot 0–5 Anderlecht (29 January 2010).

Playoffs: 6 goals - Anderlecht 6-0 Zulte Waregem (28 March 2010)
Playoffs: Lokeren 5-3 Cercle Brugge (31 March 2010)
Playoffs: AA Gent 5-0 Zulte Waregem (18 April 2010)
Playoffs: 6 goals - AA Gent 6-2 Club Brugge (8 May 2010)

Most goals in one half: 5 goals

AA Gent 5-1 Roeselare (1-0 at half-time) (12 September 2009)
Sint-Truiden 5-2 KV Mechelen (3-2 at half-time) (26 December 2009)
Charleroi 2-3 Standard Liège (0-0 at half-time) (4 February 2010)

Playoffs: 6 goals - Lokeren 3-3 Westerlo (0-0 at half-time) (10 April 2010)
Playoffs: Anderlecht 6-0 Zulte Waregem (1-0 at half-time) (28 March 2010)
Playoffs: Lokeren 5-3 Cercle Brugge (2-1 at half-time) (31 March 2010)

Most goals in one half by a single team: 4 goals

AA Gent 5-1 Roeselare (12 September 2009)
Germinal Beerschot 4-1 Sint-Truiden (7 November 2009)
Roeselare 0-4 AA Gent (30 December 2009)
Westerlo 4-0 Charleroi (20 February 2010)

Playoffs: 5 goals - Anderlecht 6-0 Zulte Waregem (28 March 2010)
Playoffs: AA Gent 6-2 Club Brugge (8 May 2010)

Most goals in a match by one player: 3 goals

Milan Jovanović for Standard Liège against Roeselare (15 August 2009).
Dawid Janczyk for Lokeren against Mouscron (12 December 2009).

Elimane Coulibaly for AA Gent against Roeselare (30 December 2009)
Cyril Théréau for Charleroi against Lokeren (10 March 2010)

Discipline
First yellow card of the season: Marc Wagemakers for Sint-Truiden against Standard Liège, 28 minutes (31 July 2009).
First red card of the season: Ibrahima Gueye for Lokeren against Zulte Waregem, 22 minutes (1 August 2009).
Card given at latest point in a game: Bojan Jorgacevic (yellow) at 90+5 minutes for AA Gent against Racing Genk (15 August 2009)
Most yellow cards in a single match: 9
Zulte Waregem 2-2 Racing Genk - 4 for Zulte Waregem (Bossut, D'Haene, Roelandts and NFor), 5 for Racing Genk (Verhulst, João Carlos (2), Tòth and Koita) (8 August 2009)
AA Gent 2-1 KV Mechelen - 3 for AA Gent (Thompson, Suler and Maric), 6 for KV Mechelen (Van Hoevelen, Persoons (2), Mununga, Vrancken and Ghomsi) (9 August 2009)
Sint-Truiden 2-0 Standard Liège - 3 for Sint-Truiden (Delorge, Alex and Onana), 6 for Standard Liège (Goreux, Ramos, Nicaise, Carcela-González, Jovanović and De Camargo) (29 November 2009)
Playoffs: 10 - Kortrijk 1-2 AA Gent - 6 for Kortrijk (Capon, Vandenbroeck, Pavlović, Kums and Vrancken (2)), 4 for AA Gent (Leye, Ljubijankič, Lepoint and Rosales) (28 March 2010)
Playoffs: Zulte Waregem 2-0 Club Brugge - 5 for Zulte Waregem (Buysse, Meert, Ernemann, Matton and Hyland), 4 for Club Brugge (Alcaraz, Blondel, Odjidja and Kouemaha) (14 April 2010)
Playoffs: 11 - Sint-Truiden 1-1 AA Gent - 4 for Sint-Truiden (Euvrard, Mennes (2), and Onana), 7 for AA Gent (Leye, Myrie, Smolders (2), Čustović, Coulibaly and El Ghanassy) (5 May 2010)
Playoffs: Zulte Waregem 1-2 Kortrijk - 4 for Zulte Waregem (Colpaert, Meert, Ernemann and NFor), 5 for Kortrijk (Hempte, De Beule, Belhocine, Benteke and Messoudi) (8 May 2010)

Source: sporza.be and Sport.be

See also
 2009–10 in Belgian football
 List of Belgian football transfers summer 2009

References

Belgian Pro League seasons
Belgian
1